Soanierana Ivongo is a district, which is a part of Analanjirofo Region, Madagascar. The population of the district was estimated to be 143,687 for 2018.

Communes
The district is further divided into nine communes:

 Ambinanisakana
 Ambahoabe
 Ambodiampana
 Andapafito
 Antanifotsy
 Antenina
 Fotsialanana
 Manompana
 Soanierana Ivongo

Infrastructure
Soanierana Ivongo is found along the National Road No.5 from Toamasina to Maroantsetra.

It is also the town where the ferry to Nosy Boraha (ile Sainte-Marie) leave.

Rivers
In its north the town is bordered by the Marimbona river.

Nature
 Ambatovaky Reserve

References and notes 

Districts of Analanjirofo